Christiana is the name of two places in the U.S. state of Wisconsin:
Christiana, Dane County, Wisconsin
Christiana, Vernon County, Wisconsin